Mikael Bo Andersson (born 10 May 1966) is a Swedish former professional ice hockey forward who played 15 seasons in the National Hockey League (NHL) for the Buffalo Sabres, Hartford Whalers, Tampa Bay Lightning, Philadelphia Flyers, and New York Islanders. Andersson is now serving as a scout for the Tampa Bay Lightning. He is the older brother of former hockey player Niklas Andersson.

Career statistics

Regular season and playoffs

International

External links 
 

1966 births
Buffalo Sabres draft picks
Buffalo Sabres players
Frölunda HC players
Hartford Whalers players
Ice hockey players at the 1998 Winter Olympics
Living people
National Hockey League first-round draft picks
New York Islanders players
Olympic ice hockey players of Sweden
Philadelphia Flyers players
Rochester Americans players
Sportspeople from Malmö
Springfield Indians players
Swedish ice hockey right wingers
Tampa Bay Lightning players
Tampa Bay Lightning scouts
Swedish expatriate ice hockey players in the United States